Kasturi Venugopal is an Indian journalist who serves as editor of The Hindu Business Line. Venugopal is the younger son of G. Kasturi.

References 

Indian male journalists
Living people
Year of birth missing (living people)
Place of birth missing (living people)